is a former Japanese football player.

Playing career
Gaya was born in Muroran on 8 February 1969. After graduating from high school, he joined Sumitomo Metal (later Kashima Antlers) in 1987. He gradually got an opportunity to play in the match as left side back. In 1994, newcomer Naoki Soma became a regular player as left side back and Gaya was converted to right side back. However his opportunity to play decreased behind Naruyuki Naito from 1995. He moved to Yokohama Marinos in 1997 and he played many matches. In 1998, he moved to Kyoto Purple Sanga. However he could hardly play in the match and he moved to J2 League club Vegalta Sendai in 2000. He played many matches as regular player. He retired end of 2001 season.

Club statistics

References

External links

1969 births
Living people
Association football people from Hokkaido
Japanese footballers
Japan Soccer League players
J1 League players
J2 League players
Kashima Antlers players
Yokohama F. Marinos players
Kyoto Sanga FC players
Vegalta Sendai players
Association football defenders
People from Muroran, Hokkaido